Jan Mertl and Yuri Schukin won in the final 6–2, 6–4, against Tobias Kamke and Julian Reister.

Seeds

Draw

Draw

External links
 Main Draw Doubles

Kazan Kremlin Cup - Doubles
2010 Doubles
2010 in Russian tennis